Borzonasca is a comune (municipality) in the Metropolitan City of Genoa in the Italian region Liguria, located about  east of Genoa.

Borzonasca borders the following municipalities: Mezzanego, Ne, Rezzoaglio, San Colombano Certénoli, Santo Stefano d'Aveto, Tornolo, and Varese Ligure.

Borzonasca is part of the Aveto Natural Regional Park.

Main sights
Church of St. Bartholomew (1628)
Oratory of Sts. Philip and James (1554)
Abbey of Borzone
Abbey of St. Andrew, founded in 1184

Twinnings
 Yara, Cuba

References

External links
Official website 

Cities and towns in Liguria